Juliano Gomes Soares (born June 6, 1983 in Araranguá), or simply Juliano, is a Brazilian attacking midfielder. He currently plays for Atlético Catalano.

Honours
Goiás State League: 2006

Contract
Paulista (Loan) 21 January 2009 to 30 November 2009
Goiás 29 June 2005 to 27 June 2010

External links

CBF 

1983 births
Living people
Brazilian footballers
Rio Branco Esporte Clube players
Sertãozinho Futebol Clube players
Goiás Esporte Clube players
Esporte Clube Santo André players
Paulista Futebol Clube players
Association football midfielders